TAT-10 was AT&T Corporation's 10th transatlantic telephone cable, in operation from 1992 to 2003, initially carrying 2 x 565 Mbit/s between United States and Norden in Germany.

The A-segment was the part on the US continental shelf, the B-segment went North of Scotland, the C-segment crossed the North-Sea continental shelf to Norden. The D-segment was a special festoon leg that carried 3 x 565 Mbit/s from Norden, repeatered at land at West-Terschelling to Bergen near Alkmaar.

References 

Infrastructure completed in 1992
Transatlantic communications cables
Germany–United States relations
1992 establishments in the United States
1992 establishments in Scotland
1992 establishments in Germany
2003 disestablishments in the United States
2003 disestablishments in Scotland
2003 disestablishments in Germany